The Toro Fault is a sinistral strike-slip fault in the departments of Valle del Cauca and Risaralda in western Colombia.

Etymology 
The fault is named after Toro, Valle del Cauca.

Description 
The Toro Fault cuts accreted oceanic rocks of the Western Ranges of the Colombian Andes, close to the Cauca River valley. It is one of the faults of the regional Cauca-Patía Fault System that bounds the eastern side of the Western Ranges along most of the range's length. This well developed fault trace has an eroded fault scarp, degraded triangular facets, and the fronts of spurs show evidence of sinistral deformation.

See also 

 List of earthquakes in Colombia
 Romeral Fault System

References

Bibliography

Maps

Further reading 
 

Seismic faults of Colombia
Strike-slip faults
Inactive faults
Faults
Faults